The Coventry and Warwickshire Society of Artists or CWSA is an art society, that runs various social events and artistic programmes in Coventry, and outside and within the Warwickshire area of England.

History 
The Coventry and Warwickshire Society of Artists (CWSA) was established by the Mayor of Coventry, Colonel William Fitzthomas Wyley in February 1912.

Presidents 

 First president: Soloman Joseph Soloman R.A.
until 1962: Sir William Orpen A.R.A. and Dame Laura Knight R.A.
until 1981: Rolf Hellberg F.R.I.B.A. (Coventry Architect)
Dr Anthony Francis Hobson (Art Historian) 
David Shepherd O.B.E.
Marquess of Hertford, of Ragley Hall 
 2012: Jane Powell
 2020: Nancy Upshall

Vice-Presidents

Sir Frank Brangwyn R.A., R.W.S., R.B.A.
Sir David Young Cameron R.A.
Sir William Russell Flint
Sir David Murray R.A.
Arthur Rackham
Sir Alfred Herbert (Major Benefactor of the Herbert Art Gallery and Museum) 
Sir Jacob Epstein
Sir Francis Alexander Newdigate Newdegate
Sir Edward Illife
Sir Hugh Casson
Dame Elisabeth Jean Frink

CASE 

The society is part of CASE: Coventry Art Societies Exhibition which was founded in April 2001 and was formerly known as the Coventry Arts Consortium. It is made up of four Coventry art societies, the other three being, Baginton Art Group, Coventry Art Guild and Coventry Watercolour Society.

References 

Organisations based in Coventry
Organizations established in 1912
Art societies
1912 establishments in England